Bukowiec  is a village in the administrative district of Gmina Koszęcin, within Lubliniec County, Silesian Voivodeship, in southern Poland.

The village has a population of 191.

References

Bukowiec